The Vectis Formation is a geological formation on the Isle of Wight and Swanage, England whose strata were formed in the lowermost Aptian, approximately 125 million years ago. The environment of deposition was that of a freshwater coastal lagoon with occasional marine influence after the early Aptian marine transgression, transitioning from the floodplain environment of the underlying Wessex Formation. The primary lithology is of laminated grey mudstones. The Vectis Formation is composed of three geological members: the Shepherds Chine member, the Barnes High Sandstone member, and the Cowleaze Chine member. It is overlain by the fully marine Atherfield Clay Formation, part of the Lower Greensand Group.  Dinosaur remains are among the fossils that have been recovered from the formation.

Fauna

 Theropod tracks 
 Polacanthus foxii 
 Hypsilophodon foxii 
 Euornithopod indet 
 Euornithopod tracks 
 Mantellisaurus atherfieldensis
 Spinosaurinae sp.
 Vectocleidus pastorum
 Hylaeochampsa vectiana

See also 
 List of dinosaur-bearing rock formations

References 

Geologic formations of England
Lower Cretaceous Series of Europe
Aptian Stage
Cretaceous England
Siltstone formations
Mudstone formations
Lagoonal deposits
Ichnofossiliferous formations
Paleontology in England